Billboard Top R&B Records of 1959 is the year-end chart compiled by Billboard magazine ranking the top rhythm and blues singles of 1959. Due to the extent of cross-over between the R&B and pop charts in 1959, the song's rank, if any, in the year-end pop chart is also provided.

See also
List of Hot R&B Sides number ones of 1959
Billboard Year-End Hot 100 singles of 1959
1959 in music

References

1959 record charts
Billboard charts
1959 in American music